WFNT (1470 kHz) is a commercial AM radio station in Flint, Michigan.  It is owned by Townsquare Media and broadcasts a talk radio format.  The studios and transmitter are on East Bristol Road in Burton.

By day, WFNT is powered at 5,000 watts.  But at night, to avoid interfering with other stations on 1470 AM, it reduces power to 1,000 watts.  WFNT uses a directional antenna with a three-tower array.  The transmitter is on FDP Drive near Bristol Road in Burton.

Programming
Weekdays begin with a local talk and information show hosted by Steve Gruber.  The rest of the weekday schedule is nationally syndicated shows from Sean Hannity, Dennis Prager, Brian Kilmeade and Brandon Tatum, with Fox Sports Radio heard overnight.  On weekends, repeats of weekday shows air, along with specialty shows on the outdoors and guns.  Bill Handel on The Law is heard on Sunday afternoons.  Most hours begin with an update from Fox News Radio.

History

WCLC, WWOK, WKMF
It broadcast at 1,000 watts day and night. Its call sign was WCLC but the next year became WWOK. It was owned by Drohlich Broadcasting, headed by Robert Drohlich, the general manager and Robert Drohlich, the program director. The studios were at 432 North Saginaw Street in Flint.

It became WKMF in 1953, owned by a radio company based in Tulsa, Oklahoma.  WKMF was a country music station during most of the years using that call sign.  Its slogan during the country years was "The country music capital of the north." WKMF's country format enjoyed a high level of ratings success during the 1960s and 1970s, often ranking among Flint's top five stations.

WFNT
Townsquare Media acquired the station in the 1990s.  It adopted its present call letters WFNT in 1993.  In the 1990s, most country music listening was switching to the FM dial, so management decided to make a change.  

Under Townsquare ownership, WFNT became a talk station.  Its syndicated program line-up included G. Gordon Liddy (who came to Flint and did his show live twice from the WFNT studios), Rush Limbaugh and Ken Hamblin.   Local talk shows were hosted by Chris Pavelich and later Tommy McIntyre and his producer Howard  "The Knife"  Gillespie.

Standards and Talk
In the early 2000s, WFNT switched to adult standards, using ABC Radio's "Stardust" (later "Timeless Classics" and "Timeless Favorites").  It also aired some local programming, including a daily shopping show and a Saturday-afternoon oldies program.  Beginning in 2007, WFNT became the flagship station for the now-defunct Flint Generals minor league hockey radio broadcasts.

When Citadel Media ended the "Timeless" format in February 2010, WFNT flipped back to talk programming on February 12.  It added syndicated shows from Premiere Networks, the Salem Radio Network and Fox Sports Radio.  It briefly carried the comedy morning show "Bob and Tom" from Indianapolis.

Previous logo

References

External links

FNT
Talk radio stations in the United States
Radio stations established in 1947
1947 establishments in Michigan
Townsquare Media radio stations